The Welsh National Bowls Championships is organised by the Welsh Bowling Association (WBA) which was formed in 1904. The first National Championships were held in 1919.     

The singles title was originally called the Cadle Cup named after P.C Cadle who presented the WBA with the cup.

Men's Singles Champions

Most singles titles

Men's Pairs Champions

Most pairs titles

Men's Triples Champions

Most triples titles

Men's Fours Champions

Most fours titles

Women's Singles Champions

Women's Pairs Champions

Women's Triples Champions

Women's Fours Champions

References

Bowls competitions
Bowls in Wales